Events from the year 1959 in Denmark.

Incumbents
 Monarch – Frederick IX
 Prime minister – H. C. Hansen

Events
 7 January  M/Sans Hedtoft departs from Copenhagen on her maiden journey to Greenland.
 14 JanuarY  M/S Hans Hedtoft arrives at Julianehåb.
 30 January  M/S Hans Hedtoft sinks on the way back to Denmark. 95 lives are lost.

Sports

Date unknown
 Palle Lykke Jensen (DEN) and Kay Werner Nielsen (DEN) win the Six Days of Copenhagen sox-day track cycling race.

Births
 10 April – Mona Juul, diplomat and politician 
 2 May – Lone Scherfig, film director
 27 November – Pernille Sams, real estate agent, lawyer and politician

Deaths
 12 January – Edvard Eriksen, sculptor, creator of the Little Mermaid statue (born 1876)
 13 April – Dagmar Hansen, cabaret singer and stage performer, Denmark's first pin-up girl (born 1871)
 21 April – Hakon Andersen, organist and composer (born 1875)
 2 September – Sigvart Werner, amateur photographer famous for his artistic landscape photographs (born 1872)

See also
1959 in Danish television

References

 
Denmark
Years of the 20th century in Denmark
1950s in Denmark